The 1999 British Open was a professional ranking snooker tournament, that was held from 4–11 April 1999 at the Plymouth Pavilions, Plymouth, England.
 
Fergal O'Brien won the tournament by defeating Anthony Hamilton nine frames to seven in the final. The defending champion, John Higgins, was defeated by O'Brien in the semi-final.

Jason Prince recorded a maximum break during qualifying for the tournament against Ian Brumby. Graeme Dott made a maximum in his round of 64 match against David Roe.



Main draw

Final

References

British Open (snooker)
British Open
Open (snooker)
April 1999 sports events in the United Kingdom